The Medal of Service of the Order of Canada was a decoration that was, within the Canadian system of honours, created at the same time as the Companion level of the Order of Canada and the Medal of Courage of the Order of Canada. The federal cabinet had refused to allow for the establishment of a multi-levelled national order, and thus the Medal of Service was established as a second tier to the Companion level.

Design
The Medal of Service of the Order of Canada was designed by Bruce W. Beatty, and is similar in shape to the other elements of the Order of Canada. A silver stylized snowflake measuring 34 mm across, the obverse depicting a single stylized maple leaf enclosed within a circle, surmounted by a Crown. The reverse bears a silver disc with the word SERVICE around the top.
The undress ribbon bore a single plain silver maple leaf in the centre. For men, the Medal of Service was hung from a bar, and for women, on a ribbon bow, both pinned to the left chest.

Conversion
The Medal of Service of the Order of Canada was converted into the Officer level of the Order of Canada in 1972 when the Order was reorganized into three levels; Companion, Officer and Member. All living holders of the Medal of Service were automatically converted into Officers of the Order of Canada and invited to exchange their Medal of Service insignia for that of Officer of the Order of Canada. Those who died prior to the promulgation of the new Letters Patent for the Order of Canada were not converted to being Officers of the Order of Canada.

An award permitted the recipients to use the post-nominal letters SM.

See also
 The Order of Canada
 Canadian order of precedence (decorations and medals)

References

Bibliography
—

Further reading

Military awards and decorations of Canada
Civil awards and decorations of Canada